The rufous potoo (Phyllaemulor bracteatus) is a species of bird in the family Nyctibiidae. It is the only member of the genus Phyllaemulor. It is found in Brazil, Colombia, Ecuador, French Guiana, Suriname Guyana, Peru, and Venezuela.

Taxonomy and systematics

A 2009 publication suggested that the rufous potoo differed enough in cranial structure and genetic divergence from other potoos (in the genus Nyctibius) that it deserved to be in its own genus, Phyllaemulor. This genus was officially described by Costa et al. in 2018. As of 2022, the BirdLife International Handbook of the Birds of the World, the International Ornithological Committee (IOC), and the South American Classification Committee of the American Ornithological Society (AOS-SACC) have followed in reclassified it into Phyllaemulor. The Clements taxonomy retains it in genus Nyctibius.

The rufous potoo is monotypic.

Description

The rufous potoo is the smallest member of its family, and the most unusually colored. It is overall a deep orange-red with large white spots; the color is paler on the throat. The spots on the upper belly have a thin black border and the tail has darker bars. It has long bristles in the loral region. It resembles a dead leaf, an impression heightened by its vertical posture on a roost, where it gently sways.

Distribution and habitat

The rufous potoo is found in Amazonia from Venezuela south to Peru and east into Brazil, French Guiana, and Guyana. The AOS-SACC also records it as "Hypothetical" in Bolivia. It is known only from scattered locations though it probably occurs more widely than them. It primarily inhabits forests on nutrient-poor soils such as those with high sand content and those in blackwater regions. It is mostly found in the under- and mid-stories of both primary and mature secondary terra firme forest. It also occurs in swampy palm forests of the Campinarana.

Behavior

Feeding

The rufous potoo forages by sallying from a perch to capture flying insects, and usually returns to the same perch. It feeds on insects of at least five orders.

Breeding

The rufous potoo's nesting season apparently spans from September to possibly February. Very few nests are known. The "nest" is unusual: The bird lays its single egg on top of a broken stub.

Vocalization

The rufous potoo's song is "a soft, rapidly descending series of roughly 10–15 notes: “bu-bu-bu-bu-bu-bu..." or "whooo, tooo, tooo, tooo, tooo, tooo, tooo, tooo, tooo, tooo, tooo, toot" that resembles the songs of some small owls. It mostly, and perhaps exclusively, sings during a few days around the full moon. It also makes "wup" or "urt" calls.

Status

The IUCN has assessed the rufous potoo as being of Least Concern, though its population is not known and is believed to be decreasing. It is "[p]robably not seriously threatened as long as extensive areas of Amazonian forest remain intact".

References

External links 
 Photos, videos and observations at Cornell Lab of Ornithologys Birds of the World
 
 Photo; Article mindobirds.com

rufous potoo
Birds of Colombia
Birds of Venezuela
Birds of the Ecuadorian Amazon
Birds of the Peruvian Amazon
Birds of the Amazon Basin
Birds of the Guianas
rufous potoo
Taxonomy articles created by Polbot
Taxobox binomials not recognized by IUCN